{{family name hatnote|Nguyễn|Linh (simply) or Thùy Linh (politely)|lang=Vietnamese}}

Nguyễn Thùy Linh (born 20 November 1997) is a Vietnamese badminton player. She started her career by leaving her hometown in Phú Thọ Province, train at the Hanoi badminton club, and later joined Da Nang club. She represented her country at the 2015 Southeast Asian Games when she was 18 years old.

 Career 

 2016 
She won her first international title at the 2016 Nepal International, and at the same year, she entered the top 100 in the women's singles world ranking.

 2022 
She won a bronze medal in the 2021 Southeast Asian Games mixed team event. She also competed in the 2022 BWF World Championships and made a huge upset when she won against Aya Ohori in the first round. She lost the second round to eventual bronze medalist An Se-young. 

On September, she won the Belgian International tournament, defeating Hirari Mizui in the final. A month later, she won her first ever World Tour title at the home tournament Vietnam Open.

 Achievements 

BWF World Tour (1 title)
The BWF World Tour, which was announced on 19 March 2017 and implemented in 2018, is a series of elite badminton tournaments sanctioned by the Badminton World Federation (BWF). The BWF World Tour is divided into levels of World Tour Finals, Super 1000, Super 750, Super 500, Super 300 (part of the HSBC World Tour), and the BWF Tour Super 100.Women's singles BWF International Challenge/Series (8 titles, 6 runners-up) Women's singles''

  BWF International Challenge tournament
  BWF International Series tournament
  BWF Future Series tournament

References

External links
 
 

1997 births
Living people
People from Phú Thọ province
21st-century Vietnamese women
Vietnamese female badminton players
Badminton players at the 2020 Summer Olympics
Olympic badminton players of Vietnam
Badminton players at the 2018 Asian Games
Asian Games competitors for Vietnam
Competitors at the 2015 Southeast Asian Games
Competitors at the 2017 Southeast Asian Games
Competitors at the 2019 Southeast Asian Games
Competitors at the 2021 Southeast Asian Games
Southeast Asian Games bronze medalists for Vietnam
Southeast Asian Games medalists in badminton